Rasim Delić (4 February 1949 – 16 April 2010) was the chief of staff of the Bosnian Army. He was a career officer in the Yugoslav Army but left it during the breakup of Yugoslavia and was convicted of war crimes by the International Criminal Tribunal for the former Yugoslavia for failing to prevent and punish crimes committed by the El Mujahid unit under his command. He was sentenced to 3 years in prison.

Career

Yugoslav National Army
Delić began his military career in the Yugoslav People's Army (JNA) on 1 October 1967 at the Military Academy for land forces, where he completed his studies there on 31 July 1971. From 1971 to 1985 he served in an artillery division of the JNA based in Sarajevo and from October 1980 to September 1984 as its commander. From September 1984 to August 1985, Rasim served as Chief of Staff and Deputy Commander of a joint artillery regiment. Between August 1985 and July 1990, except for an interruption of about eleven months in 1988/89 when he attended Command Staff School, Rasim was commander of a joint artillery regiment. On 22 December 1987 he was promoted to Lieutenant-Colonel. From 16 July 1990 to 13 April 1992, he was Assistant Chief of Operations in the 4th Corps of the JNA in Sarajevo.

Army of the Republic of Bosnia and Herzegovina
He officially requested to leave the JNA on 13 April 1992. Shortly after 13 April, Rasim was appointed as Head of the Training and Operations Organ of the Territorial Defence of RBiH.

On 16 April 1992, he was ordered to leave Sarajevo and on 19 April he arrived in Visoko, where he worked with a group of TO officers on the formation of units in central Bosnia. Eventually the Visoko Tactical Group was formed, headed by Rasim Delić. By 12 May he also became a member of the Main Staff and on that date was tasked officially with organizing and commanding armed combat activities in various municipalities in central Bosnia.

On 20 May 1992, the TO forces became the Army of the Republic of Bosnia and Herzegovina. On 17 October 1992, Sefer Halilović, then Chief of the Main Staff, appointed Rasim Delić as Acting Head of the Department of Operations Planning and Training in the Main Staff. This group was named the Operation Command Visoko.

In autumn 1992, the Visoko group was officially named Staff of the Supreme Command – Visoko Department, thus going over the head of the command of the General Staff and Defense Ministry and directly answering to the Presidency and the President.

On 27 April 1993, Sefer appointed Rasim as one of the four officers representing the ARBiH in the joint command of the ARBiH and the Croatian Defence Council (HVO).

On 8 June 1993, the Bosnian Presidency issued the reconstruction of the ARBiH Supreme Command Headquarters to include establishing the post Commander of the ARBiH Main Staff, with Rasim Delić being appointed to that post, thus assuming all control of the ARBiH and becoming a member of the extended RBiH Presidency.

Delic's greatest achievement was to prevent the collapse of the government army in the second half of 1993. That provided breathing space for negotiations, orchestrated by the US administration, which ended the conflict with the Bosnian Croats in March 1994.

Post military and retirement
Delić became the commander of the Bosnian Federation's army until his retirement in 2000.

He enrolled in Sarajevo University in December 2004. He finished with the theses "Nastanak, razvoj i uloga Armije RBiH u odbrani Bosne i Hercegovine" (Creation, expansion, and role of the army of RBiH in the defense of Bosnia and Herzegovina).

He was also involved in some non-profit organizations. He was also the co-founder of Udruženja za zaštitu tekovina borbe za Bosnu i Hercegovinu.

War crimes indictment
He was charged with war crimes by the International Criminal Tribunal for the former Yugoslavia, and given a three-year jail sentence. He was sentenced by the Trial Chamber for failure to prevent or punish the cruel treatment of twelve captured Serb soldiers in the village of Livade and in the Kamenica camp near Zavidovići in July and August 1995 at the hands of the Mujahideen. At the time the general was remanded to the Detention Unit until the end of the appellate proceedings.

History and the charge
Foreign mujahideen arrived in central Bosnia in the second half of 1992 with the aim of helping their Bosnian Muslim (Bosniak) coreligionists by conducting "Jihad" against "enemies of Bosnian Muslims" during the Bosnian War. Mostly they came from North Africa, the Near East and the Middle East. On 13 August 1993, the Bosnian Army officially organized foreign volunteers into the detachment known as "El Mujahid" (El Mudžahid) in order to impose control and order.

However, the ICTY Appeals Chamber in Kubura and Hadžihasanović case noted that the relationship between the 3rd Corps of the Bosnian Army headed by Hadžihasanović and the El Mujahedin detachment was not one of subordination but was instead close to overt hostility since the only way to control the detachment was to attack them as if they were a distinct enemy force.

Soldiers of the "El Mujahid" units, committed various war crimes and inhumane dealings with Serb and Croat soldiers, mainly prisoners, the following among others:

According to the indictment, on 8 June 1993, the same day Delić was appointed commander of the Headquarters, the Bosnian Army imprisoned 200 Croatian soldiers who surrendered after battles in and around the village of Maline. The captured soldiers were ordered by the Military Police of the ARBiH 306th Mountain Brigade to march towards the nearby settlement of Mehurići, several miles from Maline. Near the village of Poljanice they met a group of around ten Mujahideen who took a group of around twenty Croat soldiers and one woman and ordered them to come with them back to Maline. They were all ordered to stand in line after which they were murdered. According to the international prosecutor's indictment Delić was informed about these crimes but did nothing to prevent them or punish the criminals.
On 21 June 1995, two soldiers of the Army of Republika Srpska were arrested and soon afterwards beheaded by soldiers of Army of RBiH. The indictment states other prisoners arrested on the same day were tortured and then taken to Kamenica Camp. Another Serbian soldier, Gojko Vujičić, was alleged to have been beheaded on 24 July 1995. Other prisoners were forced to kiss the head which was on display in the room they were held in. Various types of torture were practiced in Kamenica Camp, including by electric shock, or causing horrible pain to the subjects by having rubber pipes inserted into their legs and then pumping the tubing up with increasingly higher air pressure.
On 11 September 1995 around sixty Serbian soldiers were arrested together with three women who were all then transferred to Kamenica Camp. All of the soldiers were never seen again and it is presumed they are dead. It is alleged that three women were raped and later freed, on 10 November 1995. However, on 26 February 2008, Delić was acquitted on charges of rape under the Rule 98 bis of the Rules of Procedure and Evidence. According to presiding judge Bakone Moloto, in the course of its case, the prosecution did not lead any evidence on count three related to the rape.
Another group of ten Serbian soldiers was arrested on 10 September 1995. They were all subjected to torture for a period of twelve days.

It was alleged that Delić knew that the Mujahideen and other soldiers of his army intended to commit those crimes and knew that Kamenica Camp was the place those crimes were likely to happen but he did nothing to prevent those crimes.

On 3 March 2005, Delić surrendered voluntarily to the International Court. He pleaded not guilty on all accounts.

Trial and verdict
On 15 September 2008, after around eleven months of trial, the court passed the judgment in case of Delić. He was two times temporarily released to Bosnia, the first time in May 2005 and the second time during new year break on 11 December 2007. The prosecutors did not have remarks on these decisions. While on his second release, Delić was held in home detention for a while because he spoke with Haris Silajdžić – he was accused of having talked about his case with him, but he claimed he only talked about friends and family.

The prosecutors requested fifteen years of jail, while the defence requested his release for his guilt had not been proven. The defence claimed that in critical time he did not have control over Mujahideen so that he had not been in a position to have stopped them or for that matter to have punished them.

The court, however, concluded that Delić was not guilty for crimes over Croatian soldiers in Maline for he had been appointed commander of the headquarters on the same day. He was also found not guilty of cruelty and murder in village Kesten and Kamenica Camp, where Mujahideen killed one old man and 52 Serbian soldiers as well as torturing another 10. He was found guilty only for one charge for failure to prevent or punish the cruel treatment of twelve captured Serb soldiers in the village of Livade and in the Kamenica camp. He was found not guilty for the other counts.

Although the war crimes of the El Mujahideen battalion were proven, and it was agreed by most of the court that Delić had effective control over that unit during that time, the judges concluded that Delić could not have known about those murders at the time so he could not have stopped them.

Delić was sentenced to three years in prison, with the 448 days already spent in detention counted as part of that sentence.

Death
Delic died on 16 April 2010 in his apartment in Sarajevo. He was survived by his wife Suada, as well as his two sons and four grandchildren.

Publications
Čast je braniti Bosnu (2002)
Armija Republike Bosne i Hercegovine – nastanak, razvoj i odbrana zemlje (2007)
101 ratna priča (2010)

References

1949 births
2010 deaths
Bosniaks of Bosnia and Herzegovina
Bosnia and Herzegovina people imprisoned abroad
Bosnia and Herzegovina generals
Bosniaks of Bosnia and Herzegovina convicted of war crimes
People convicted by the International Criminal Tribunal for the former Yugoslavia
People from Čelić
Army of the Republic of Bosnia and Herzegovina soldiers
Officers of the Yugoslav People's Army